Legends of Tomorrow is an American action-adventure television series developed by Greg Berlanti, Marc Guggenheim, Andrew Kreisberg and Phil Klemmer, who are also executive producers along with Sarah Schechter and Chris Fedak; Klemmer serves as showrunner. The series airs on The CW and is a spin-off from Arrow and The Flash, existing in the same fictional universe.

Series overview

Episodes

Season 1 (2016)

Season 2 (2016–17)

Season 3 (2017–18)

Season 4 (2018–19)

Season 5 (2020)

Season 6 (2021)

Season 7 (2021–22)

Ratings

Notes

References

Episodes
Lists of American action television series episodes
Lists of American science fiction television series episodes
Lists of Arrowverse episodes